Craig Annis (born 10 May 1983) is an Australian radio and television personality. He hosts the breakfast show Craig & Mandy with Mandy Coolen from 5.30am till 9am on The Central Coast's Star 104.5. He was a Roving Reporter on Live on Bowen with longtime comedy partner Stefan Taylor with whom he had a Triple M Brisbane show with called Stefan & Craig and an RMITV show called Stefan and Craig Slightly Live. Annis was also a radio presenter on SAFM.

References

1983 births
Living people
Australian radio personalities
Australian male voice actors
Australian male comedians
RMITV alumni